William Alington or Allington may refer to:

Sir William Alington (speaker) (died 1446), Speaker of the House of Commons, MP for Cambridgeshire, 1410, 1416, 1429
William Allington (of Horseheath) (1400–1459), MP for Cambridgeshire, 1433, 1436, 1439?
Sir William Allington (of Bottisham) (after 1428–1479), Speaker of the House of Commons, MP for Cambridgeshire, 1472, 1477, married Joanne Ansty, daughter of John Ansty, in 1457
William Alington, 1st Baron Alington (1610/1–1648), Irish peer
William Alington, 3rd Baron Alington (before 1641–1685), Irish peer, MP for Cambridge, 1664–1685
William Alington (architect) (born 1929), New Zealand Modernist architect
Bill Allington (1903–1966), American Minor league baseball player and manager

See also
Baron Alington
Alington (surname)